Solomon's Seal may refer to:

Seal of Solomon, a legendary object, symbol, or tincture
Solomon's knot, two interlocked closed curves
Solomon's Seal (album), a 1972 album by Pentangle
Solomon's Seal (novel), a 1980 novel by Hammond Innes
Solomon's Seal motif, a white starlike flower
Polygonatum, a genus of flowering plants
Maianthemum or "false Solomon's Seal", a genus of flowering plants

See also
Star of David, a hexagram symbol of Judaism